Raja Ka Tajpur is a city and a municipal board in Bijnor district in the Indian state of Uttar Pradesh.

Raja ka Tajpur is a small town in Bijnor District, halfway between Nurpur and Seohara. Its location is to the south of the district headquarters, Bijnor.
Daranagar, Ganj and Vidur Kuti are the important religious sites worth visiting from here.

Geography
It has an average elevation of 211 metres (692 feet).
 
Tajpur is about 8 km from Noorpur and 15 km from Sahaspur. Seohara Railway Station, at a distance of 12 km, is the nearest railway station. Nearest airport is Jolly Grant Airport.

Education
R G N P Inter College, Raja Ka Tajpur, Bijnor

RGNP Degree college

Aksh Degree college

Aksh Pharmacy college

Religious Places
Sacred Heart Church, Tajpur

References

Cities and towns in Bijnor district